Johnny Harris (born 3 November 1973) is an English actor, screenwriter, producer and director best known for his roles in film and television, including Without Sin, Jawbone, This is England '86, A Christmas Carol, The Salisbury Poisonings, Medici, Troy: Fall of a City, Snow White and the Huntsman, Fortitude, Monsters: Dark Continent, The Fades, Welcome to the Punch, and London to Brighton.

Harris's breakthrough role came in the feature film London to Brighton. He received BAFTA and Royal Television Society Award nominations for his performance in the Shane Meadows cult television series This is England '86.

Harris made his debut as a screenwriter with the 2017 feature film Jawbone in which he starred in the lead role alongside Ray Winstone, Ian McShane and Michael Smiley. Harris also co-produced the movie. The production was backed by BBC Films and released in cinemas in May 2017. Harris received a BAFTA Film Award Nomination in Outstanding Debut category for his work on the film.

In 2018, Harris appeared as Agamemnon in the BBC/Netflix drama series Troy: Fall of a City.

In 2019, he played Franklin Scrooge in the BBC/Fox TV adaptation of A Christmas Carol alongside Guy Pearce, Andy Serkis and Stephen Graham. The show was exec produced by Tom Hardy and Ridley Scott and written by Steven Knight.

In 2020, Harris starred as Bruno Bernardi in the third and final season of the Netflix drama series Medici Season 3 (2019). Filming took place in Rome and Tuscany. In the same year, he also portrayed Charlie Rowley in the highly acclaimed BBC Drama Series The Salisbury Poisonings. A mini-series based on the tragic real life events of 2018.

In 2022, Harris was reunited on screen with Vicky McClure in the new ITVX Drama Without Sin. This was the first time the two had appeared together on screen since their portrayal of father and daughter in the multi- award winning This is England '86. 

Harris made his debut behind the camera in 2018, directing the music video for the Paul Weller single "Gravity".

Career

Born in Lambeth, London, in November 1973, Harris studied acting at Morley College. He started his career on the stage in London's fringe theatre scene before landing his breakthrough role in the feature film London to Brighton. In an interview in The Independent on Sunday at the time of the film's release, celebrated British film director Shane Meadows said of Harris' performance in the film: "It's an incredibly bold and massively powerful performance, the best I've seen on celluloid for a long time."

Four years later, Meadows cast Harris in This Is England '86. Harris received both BAFTA TV Award and Royal Television Society Award nominations for his portrayal of Lol's abusive father Mick Jenkins. The following year he reprised the role in This Is England '88, with the show winning the BAFTA TV Award for Best Mini-Series.

Harris continued a run of award-winning projects with a leading role in the BBC drama The Fades, which won a BAFTA TV Award for Best Drama Series.

In 2012, Harris was then cast in the Universal Pictures movie Snow White and the Huntsman starring Kristen Stewart, Charlize Theron and Chris Hemsworth. Harris played one of the ‘Seven Dwarves’ alongside Bob Hoskins, Ray Winstone, and Ian McShane.

Another feature film followed with Welcome to the Punch starring James McAvoy, and Mark Strong, being released internationally in 2013.

The Independent described Harris as "One of Britain's finest actors".

In 2015, Harris played Ronnie Morgan in the Sky Atlantic/Pivot 12-part drama Fortitude alongside Sir Michael Gambon and Stanley Tucci. Fortitude was shot on location in Iceland and London, and aired on both sides of the Atlantic in January 2015.

In 2015 Harris was cast in his first starring role in a feature film as the American Platoon Sergeant Noah Frater in the feature film Monsters: Dark Continent, the sequel to the Gareth Edwards film Monsters.

In the same year, Harris returned as Mick Jenkins in This Is England '90, the final instalment of the successful series. He also starred as DCI John Hind, opposite Anne-Marie Duff in From Darkness, a new four-part drama for BBC1.
 
In February 2016, filming began on Harris' debut project as a screenwriter with the feature film Jawbone. He co-produced the film and also starred in the lead role, alongside Ray Winstone, Ian McShane and Michael Smiley.

Paul Weller composed and recorded an original soundtrack for Jawbone. Former World Featherweight Boxing Champion Barry McGuigan and his son, the esteemed trainer Shane McGuigan served as boxing consultants on the film, as well as spending two years training Harris in preparation for his portrayal of ex-boxer Jimmy McCabe.

The production was backed by BBC Films and released in cinemas in May 2017, with Harris receiving a BAFTA Film Award 'Outstanding Debut by a British Writer, Director, or Producer' nomination for his work on the film, as well as winning two National Film Awards for 'Best Action' and 'Best Breakthrough Performance'. Harris also received a Writers Guild of Great Britain 'Best Debut Screenplay' Award nomination. Harris also received BIFA Award Nominations in both 'Best Actor' and 'Best Debut Screenplay' categories.

In 2018 Harris returned to television as Agamemnon in the BBC / Netflix series Troy: Fall of a City. Filming took place on location in Cape Town, South Africa.

In the same year, he also made his debut behind the camera, directing the music video for the Paul Weller single Gravity.

In 2019, Harris  appeared as Franklin Scrooge in the BBC/Fox TV adaptation of A Christmas Carol alongside Guy Pearce, Andy Serkis and Stephen Graham. The show was written by Steven Knight and produced by Tom Hardy and Ridley Scott.

In 2020, he starred as Bruno Bernardi in the third and final season of the Netflix drama series Medici Season 3 (2019). Filming took place in Rome and Tuscany.

In the same year, Harris also played Charlie Rowley in the BBC drama series The Salisbury Poisonings, a mini-series based on the tragic real life events of 2018.

In 2022, Harris was reunited on screen with Vicky McClure in the new ITVX Drama Without Sin. This was the first time the two had appeared together on screen since their portrayal of father and daughter in the multi- award winning This is England '86.

Filmography

Film 
Gangster No. 1 (2000) as Derek
It Was an Accident (2000) as Robbie
London to Brighton (2006) as Derek
Atonement (2007) as Soldier in Bray Bar
The Cottage (2008) as Smoking Joe (uncredited)
Daylight Robbery (2008) as Terry
RocknRolla (2008) as Gary
The Imaginarium of Doctor Parnassus (2009) as Policeman
Dorian Gray (2009) as James Vane
You Will Meet a Tall Dark Stranger (2010) as Ray's Friend
Black Death (2010) as Mold
Huge (2010) as Warren Duggan
Ultramarines: A Warhammer 40,000 Movie (2010) as Brother Nidon (voice)
War Horse (2011) as Infantry Recruitment Officer
Home (2011)
Snow White and the Huntsman (2012) as Quert
Welcome to the Punch (2013) as Dean Warns
The Last Days on Mars (2013) as Robert Irwin
Monsters: Dark Continent (2014) as Noah Frater
Jawbone (2017) as Jimmy McCabe

Television
Holby City (2000) as Sammy Briscoe
The Bill (2002) as Danny Hines
EastEnders (2005) as Sean
HolbyBlue (2007) as Garry Drake
Clapham Junction (2007, TV Movie) as Tough Man
Heroes and Villains (2008, TV Series documentary) as Oenameaus / Narrator
The Passion (2008) as Asher
Whitechapel (2009) as DC Sanders
Law & Order: UK (2010) as Harry Lucas
This Is England '86 (2010, Nominated BAFTA Television Award for Best Supporting Actor, and Nominated Royal Television Society Award for Best Actor) as Mick
The Fades (2011) as Neil Valentine
This Is England '88 (2011) as Mick
Fortitude (2015) as Ronnie Morgan
This is England '90 (2015) as Mick
From Darkness (2015) as DCI John Hind
Troy: Fall of a City (2018) as Agamemnon
Medici (2019) as Bruno Bernardi
A Christmas Carol (2019) as Franklin Scrooge
The Salisbury Poisonings (2020) as Charlie Rowley
Without Sin (2022) as Charles Stone
Great Expectations (2023) as Magwitch

References

External links

1973 births
21st-century English male actors
English male film actors
English male television actors
English male stage actors
English male writers
People from Lambeth
Living people